The Forstbotanischer Garten Köln (25 hectares) is an arboretum and woodland botanical garden located at Schillingsrotterstraße 100, Rodenkirchen, Cologne, North Rhine-Westphalia, Germany. It forms part of the city's outer green belt and is open daily without charge.

The garden was created between 1962–1964 on a former military site which was, until the end of World War I, a part of the Äußerer Festungsring Köln, the outer ring of fortresses surrounding Cologne. Its ruins have been integrated into the plantings as a rock garden. In the 1980s, an adjoining natural area was created as the Friedenswald with additional tree plantings.

Today the garden contains exotic and native trees. Of particular interest are the Rhododendron ravine, heather garden, peonies (Paeonia), Japanese plantings (including Acer palmatum, Cercidiphyllum, and Bambusoideae), and North American plantings (1.5 hectares, including Sequoiadendron giganteum, Pinus ponderosa, and Abies concolor). The Friedenswald (20 hectares) contains a large meadow surrounded by deciduous and coniferous forests containing trees and shrubs from all nations with which Germany has diplomatic relations; tropical and subtropical species are represented by symbolic trees.

See also 

 Flora und Botanischer Garten Köln
 List of botanical gardens in Germany

References 
 Forstbotanischer Garten Köln
 Koelntourismus entry
 Qype entry, with photographs
 Charles Quest-Ritson, Gärten in Deutschland: ein Reiseführer zu den schönsten Gartenanlagen, Birkhäuser, 1999, page 109.
 Stadt Köln. Der Oberstadtdirektor (ed.): Das Großzentrum Köln und seine Verflechtungen, Köln, 1972–1973.
 Josef Fachinger: Gutachten zu der Denkschrift der Stadtverwaltung Köln über die Eingemeindung des Landkreises Köln zur Stadt Köln, Frechen, 1945.
 Stadt Köln (ed.): Das neue Köln. Ein Vorentwurf, Köln, 1950.

Koln, Forstbotanischer Garten
Koln, Forstbotanischer Garten
Koln, Forstbotanischer Garten
Tourist attractions in Cologne
Rodenkirchen